The salsa competition at the 2017 World Games took place on 28 July 2017 at the Centennial Hall in Wrocław, Poland.

Competition format
A total of 10 pairs from 9 nations entered the competition. In first round best six pairs qualified directly to the semifinal. In the redance additional two pairs are advancing to the semifinal. From semifinal the best six pairs qualifies to the final.

Results

First round

Redance

Semifinal

Final

References 

 
2017 World Games